Denis Dunlop (1892–1959) was a sculptor working throughout England during the first half of the 20th century. His work is instantly identifiable for the bold use of stylised Art Deco forms, breath-taking attention to detail and ingenious composition.

Dunlop joined the London Scottish Regiment as a private in 1914. After the war, he became a clerk on a cargo ship sailing between London and Vladivostok. He studied at St. Martins and Central School of Arts and Crafts before going on to become an assistant in the studio of Alfred Gilbert, the sculptor of Eros in Piccadilly Circus. In 1932, he married acclaimed modernist artist, Aletta May Lewis.

He exhibited in the summer exhibition at the Royal Academy on three occasions: Ant (1930); Pegasus (1933); Head of Harold Lewis (1948). On many occasions, Dunlop worked with architectural giants, Whinney Son & Austen Hall, with his works forming the centre-piece of their designs. Much of his work was part of the regeneration of London after the war.

The survival and location of much of his work are unknown.

Known works 

 RMS Queen Elizabeth (Cunard, 1938): panels depicting hunting, shooting, and fishing. Whilst undergoing refurbishment works in Hong Kong harbour in 1972, the liner caught fire and capsized. Fire-damaged and now partially dismantled, the vessel's remains lie on the sea-bed of the harbour;
Lambeth Town Hall, London (Whinney Son & Austen Hall, 1935–8): statue 'Youth rising from the Past', added as part of extension and redevelopment works in the 1930s;
 Former London Midland & Scottish Railway (LMS) School of Transport, Derby (William Henry Hamlyn, 1937–8): eight square bas-relief panels carved in Portland stone and set between each window on the majestic facade. Each panel represents different activities of the LMS: locomotive building, rolling stock construction, signals, and telegraphs, civil engineering, architecture, research, marine transport and traffic operations;
RIBA Headquarters, 66 Portland Place, London (George G. Wornum, 1932–4): Dominion screen to the Florence Hall carved in Quebec pine. There are a total of twenty square panels depicting scenes from the Commonwealth countries;
 Former gas company showroom, George Street, Luton (Whinney Son & Austen Hall, 1936): figure with Flambeau;
 Midland Bank, Camden Town, London (1930s): pair of curved bas-relief panels with central herald's staff or caduceus. Through the association of this staff carried by Hermes in Greek mythology, the caduceus symbolizes commerce and negotiation. These staffs are surrounded by plans, cheques, and scales;
Fishmonger's Hall, London (restored Whinney Son & Austen Hall, 1951): it is known that Dunlop designed panels for this building as part of Whinney Son & Austen Hall's restoration works following damage during WWII. Though it is understood that his work survives, it has not yet been formally identified and attributed;
 The Institute of Bankers, originally 10 Lombard Street (Whinney Son & Austen Hall, 1938–40): twelve window reveals depicting the history of trade and banking. The buildings on the site of 10-15 Lombard Street were demolished in the early 2000s. It is unknown if any of Dunlop's work was salvaged;
 Pegasus House or New Filton House, Filton, Bristol (Whinney Son & Austen Hall): former headquarters of Bristol Aeroplane Company, now Airbus offices. Dunlop's works include a statue of Pegasus and a 'Britain First' panel to the east elevation, and a figure of Mercury to the west elevation. For the entrance foyer, Dunlop designed a spectacular inlay floor of marble, silver, and brass depicting the signs of the zodiac. (The connection between these astrological symbols and flight may not be immediately apparent; the Zodiac was the name given to the Bristol Aeroplane Company's first aircraft, which never made it off the ground). Perhaps Dunlop's best known surviving sculptures are in the window reveals to the projection room at Pegasus House. These ten elegant plaster panels chart the histories of natural and powered flight and are composed of winged insects, dandelion clocks, flying fish, birds, Icarus, spinning planets, parachutes, zeppelins, bi-planes, etc. Pegasus House, since 1999 a Grade II listed building, was abandoned and left to fall prey to dereliction and vandalism for over twenty years, before undergoing extensive renovation works in 2013.
In December 2014, a striking plaster panel depicting muscled men and signed D.C. Dunlop (Denis Cheyne Dunlop) appeared on BBC's Antiques Roadshow. The owner of the panel was unaware of its provenance and the antiques expert was unfamiliar with the sculptor. Much intrigue surrounded this handsome panel, leading to a spin-off episode of Antiques Roadshow Detectives. The origins of the panel remain unknown.

References

External links
Denis Dunlop at Mapping the Practice and Profession of Sculpture in Britain and Ireland 1851-1951
RMS Queen Elizabeth

20th-century British sculptors
1892 births
1959 deaths
English sculptors
English male sculptors
Art Deco
London Scottish soldiers
British Army personnel of World War I